Ester Ledecká (born 23 March 1995) is a Czech snowboarder and alpine skier. At the 2018 Winter Olympics in Pyeongchang, Ledecká won gold medals in the super-G in alpine skiing and in the parallel giant slalom in snowboarding, becoming the first person to not only compete in the Winter Olympics using two different types of equipment (skis and snowboard) but further to win two gold medals and do so at the same Winter Olympics. She was the second woman to win Olympic gold in two separate disciplines but the first to do so at the same Winter Olympics. She was the first Czech to win the parallel giant slalom in snowboarding at the FIS Snowboard World Cup.

Early life
Ester Ledecká was born in Prague, to mother Zuzana, a figure skater, and father Janek Ledecký, a well-known musician in the Czech Republic and Slovakia. She comes from a sporting family: her maternal grandfather is former ice hockey player Jan Klapáč, who was a seven-time World Championship and two-time Olympic medallist. In 2014, she was still at high school, attending a distance-learning programme in Prague.

Ice hockey was the first sport she took up as a child, before taking up skiing at the age of four and later adding snowboarding. "I was following what my brother did," Ledecká says. "He is one and a half years older than me, and so when he started with a board, I wanted to do it too. I was five years old when I started snowboarding, and I did freestyle snowboarding and boardercross until I was about thirteen years old. And again, it was my brother who started with alpine snowboarding, and I wanted to beat him, so I learned that too."

Her hobbies include playing the guitar and singing. She also enjoys participating in summer sports such as beach volleyball and windsurfing.

Career
Ledecká competed in her first World Cup tournament in the 2012–13 competition, finishing in 13th place in the parallel giant slalom event. In March 2013, at the age of 17, she won gold in the parallel slalom event at the Junior World Championships, her second gold of the competition. She was named "Junior Sportsperson of the year" at the Czech Republic's 2013 Sportsperson of the Year awards.

During the 2013–14 FIS Snowboard World Cup, Ledecká placed second behind Patrizia Kummer in the first parallel slalom event in Bad Gastein and third in the second event. She subsequently won gold at Rogla in the parallel giant slalom event at the same competition, becoming the first Czech to do so. In doing so, she also became just the third Czech to win any World Cup snowboarding event.

Ahead of the 2014 Winter Olympics, The Daily Telegraph's Andrew Lawton mentioned Ledecká as the "one to watch" in the women's snowboarding competition. She was among the Czech athletes most expected to win a medal at the games, along with Martina Sáblíková, Gabriela Soukalová and fellow snowboarder Eva Samková. After she had finished ninth in qualifying for the alpine skiing event at the Winter Olympics, the Czech Ski Association attempted to register her as a competitor. However, the FIS rejected the proposal, reiterating that only eight Czechs could compete.

Ledecká made her Olympic debut at the 2014 Winter Olympics on 19 February 2014 in the parallel giant slalom snowboarding event. She reached the quarter-final stage before being eliminated by Patrizia Kummer, who went on to win the gold medal in the event. Ledecká was classified as seventh overall.

Ledecká has combined her snowboarding career with competing in alpine skiing: she made her debut on the FIS Alpine Ski World Cup in February 2016, finishing 24th in her first race, the Kandahar downhill in Garmisch. She went on to score points in four of her first five World Cup races, competing in the downhill and Super-G disciplines.  In 2017 she became the first sportsperson to compete in World Championships in both skiing and snowboarding, taking a gold in the parallel giant slalom and a silver in the parallel slalom at the Freestyle Ski and Snowboarding World Championships in Sierra Nevada, Spain, and scoring top 30 finishes in the downhill, super-G and alpine combined at the Alpine Skiing World Championships in St. Moritz, Switzerland.

Ledecká made her Olympic debut in alpine skiing at the 2018 Winter Olympics while also being qualified for alpine snowboarding. She won the gold medal in super-G in alpine skiing at the 2018 Winter Olympics in a historic upset. She was visibly shocked after finishing 0.01 seconds ahead of the 2014 Olympics defending gold medalist Anna Veith, who had already been proclaimed the winner by many media outlets. Ledecká was ranked 49th in the event before the Olympics and had never medalled in any World Cup level international skiing event. To make the feat even more surprising to reporters, she was rumored to be allegedly racing on skis borrowed from Mikaela Shiffrin (both racers are sponsored by Atomic). She refused to remove her goggles for the post-victory press conference, insisting that this is her trademark (which is true), and when pressed by reporters, she cleverly stated that she had skipped wearing makeup as she had not expected to win the event. Her snowboard coach, American Justin Reiter, arrived at the start of the Ladies PGS event with his reversible Czech team jacket confidently already turned gold side out. After victory in the parallel giant slalom she became the first ever female athlete to win an Olympic gold medal in two different disciplines during the same Winter Olympics (Anfisa Reztsova had previously won gold in different disciplines but not at the same Olympics: cross country skiing in 1988 and biathlon in 1992 and 1994). Ledecká was chosen as the flag bearer for the Czech Republic at the closing ceremony.

In the 2018–19 Alpine Ski World Cup, Ledecká finished 24th in the downhill standings and 28th in super-G. In December 2019, Ledecká scored her first win on the Alpine Ski World Cup in downhill at Lake Louise, eclipsing her previous personal best World Cup downhill result of seventh at the same venue two years previously. In December 2020, she won her first  World Cup Super-G race.

Ledecká continued to split her time between snowboarding and Alpine skiing, finishing second in World Cup Alpine skiing in the downhill for the 2020 season and third for the 2022 season, as well as third in the combined in 2020, the last season it has been contested due to the COVID-19 pandemic.  In the 2022 Winter Olympics, Ledecká repeated as the snowboarding gold medalist in parallel giant slalom, while in Alpine skiing she finished fifth in super-G and fourth in 
combined.  However, she was injured while training during the summer of 2022 and targeted a possible return during February 2023.. Ultimately, she was unable to return for the Alpine skiing world championships in February but made it back for the final snowboarding races in March at Berchtesgaden, where she won the women's parallel slalom for her only win of the season.

World Cup results
All results are sourced from the International Ski Federation (FIS).

Snowboarding

Season titles
 7 titles – (4 parallel overall, 3 parallel giant slalom)

Season standings

Race podiums
 21 wins – (18 PGS, 3 PSL)
 35 podiums – (27 PGS, 8 PSL)

Alpine skiing

Season standings

Race podiums 
 3 wins (2 DH, 1 SG)
 8 podiums (6 DH, 1 SG, 1 AC)

Olympic results 
 3 medals – (3 golds)

Snowboarding
 2 medals – (2 golds)

Alpine skiing
 1 medal – (1 gold)

World Championships results

Snowboarding
 3 medals – (2 gold, 1 silver)

Alpine skiing

See also
 List of multi-sport athletes - Snowboarding
 Dual sport and multi-sport Olympians
 Czech Republic at the 2014 Winter Olympics
 Czech Republic at the 2018 Winter Olympics 
 List of multiple Olympic gold medalists in one event

References

External links
  (as snowboarder)
  (as alpine skier)
 
 
 
 
 
 

1995 births
Czech female snowboarders
Olympic gold medalists for the Czech Republic
Snowboarders at the 2014 Winter Olympics
Snowboarders at the 2018 Winter Olympics
Snowboarders at the 2022 Winter Olympics
Olympic snowboarders of the Czech Republic
Medalists at the 2018 Winter Olympics
Medalists at the 2022 Winter Olympics
Alpine skiers at the 2018 Winter Olympics
Alpine skiers at the 2022 Winter Olympics
Olympic alpine skiers of the Czech Republic
Sportspeople from Prague
Living people
Czech female alpine skiers
Olympic medalists in alpine skiing
Olympic medalists in snowboarding